Yeung Ka Tsuen is a village in Tai Tong, Shap Pat Heung, Yuen Long District, Hong Kong.

Education
Yeung Ka Tsuen is in Primary One Admission (POA) School Net 73. Within the school net are multiple aided schools (operated independently but funded with government money) and one government school: South Yuen Long Government Primary School (南元朗官立小學).

In the summer of 1942, when the Japanese army was reported to have come to raid the area, the guerrillas quickly evacuated with their firearms and hid themselves in the Tanchai Mountain behind Sulu. When the Japanese army failed to find the guerrillas, they took Yang Zhunan away and imprisoned him for more than a month. The Japanese tortured him in an attempt to force him to give up information about the guerrillas. The Japanese tortured him to force him to give information about the guerrillas, but he refused, insisting that he did not know.

References

External links

 Antiquities Advisory Board. Historic Building Appraisal. Sik Lo – Main Building, Yeung Ka Tsuen Pictures
 Antiquities Advisory Board. Historic Building Appraisal. Sik Lo, Ancillary Block, Yeung Ka Tsuen Pictures
 Antiquities Advisory Board. Historic Building Appraisal. Sik Lo, Entrance Gate, Yeung Ka Tsuen Pictures

Villages in Yuen Long District, Hong Kong
Shap Pat Heung